1 + 3 is a live album by bassist Ron Carter which was recorded in Tokyo in 1978 and released on the Japanese JVC label the following year.

Reception

The AllMusic review by Ron Wynn stated "Exactly the kind of impressive, high level playing and interaction you'd expect from this trio. ... While it's Carter's session, there's really no leader or followers, just three wonderful musicians fully attuned to each other".

Track listing
All compositions by Ron Carter.
 "Muffin" – 8:56
 "Mr. T.W." – 14:01
 "Doom" – 8:56
 "New Song #3" – 12:20

Personnel
Ron Carter – double bass
Herbie Hancock (tracks 3 & 4), Hank Jones (tracks 1 & 2) - piano
Tony Williams – drums

References

JVC Records live albums
Ron Carter live albums
1979 live albums